Scalesia affinis is a species of flowering plant in the family Asteraceae. It is endemic to the Galápagos Islands, Ecuador.

It is one of the most widely distributed Scalesia species and occurs on four major islands: Fernandina Island, Isabela Island (main distribution area), Santa Cruz Island and Floreana Island.

Populations from Santa Cruz and Floreana display some morphological and genetic divergence from populations of Fernandina Island and Isabela Island.

References

 Eliasson, U.H. 1974. Studies in Galapagos Plants XIV. The Genus Scalesia Arn.Opera Botanica, 36: 1-117
 Nielsen, L.R. 2004. Molecular differentiation within and among Island Populations of the Endemic Plant Scalesia affinis (Asteraceae) from the Galápagos Islands. Heredity, 93: 434–442.

affinis
Flora of the Galápagos Islands
Least concern plants
Taxonomy articles created by Polbot